KXPR (88.9 FM) is a classical music-formatted radio station in the Sacramento, California, area. The station is closely linked to sister-station KXJZ (90.9 FM), and the two stations are known as Capital Public Radio (now CapRadio).  Both stations are owned by Sacramento State and share studio operations on campus, and KXPR's transmitter is located in Walnut Grove.

In 2006 the stations swapped signals to their current configuration. The swap marked a return of sorts to KXPR's roots; in 1979, the station had originally signed in at 88.9 FM before moving to 90.9 in 1984.

KXPR carries programming from NPR, and also has locally produced features as well as classical music shows. Although KXPR does have a HD Radio channel, it has yet to sign on a HD2 or HD3 subcarrier.

Additional shows from KXPR's schedule include: At the Opera with host Sean Bianco, The Metropolitan Opera Saturday matinee performances, Sound and Spirit with host Ellen Kushner, Harmonia (with the accent on the third of four syllables), Musical Stages, The Thistle & Shamrock, The Chamber Music Society of Lincoln Center, From the Top, as well as A Prairie Home Companion, among others. Laurel Zucker, flutist and Professor of Music at California State University in Sacramento, can be heard on her Cantilena Records ' CDs regularly on KXPR.
The station's powerful signal of 50,000 watts can reach both Sacramento and Stockton areas fairly easily as the location of its transmitter is roughly in between both metropolitan areas. Therefore, Stockton residents now also have a full-market classical-formatted radio station ever since KXPR and KXJZ exchanged frequencies back in 2006.

KXPR is rebroadcast in the Yuba Sutter area on 88.7 KXJS and in the Central Sierra on 91.7 KXSR.

References

External links
KXPR 88.9 Official site
KXPR Schedule

XPR
Classical music radio stations in the United States
NPR member stations
Radio stations established in 1991
1991 establishments in California